Eusebius Theodore Hutchings (March 19, 1886 - November 30, 1958), commonly known as E. T. Hutchings, was an American architect in Louisville, Kentucky. Hutchings was born in Louisville in 1886. He attended Kentucky State University and Cornell University. He also studied architecture in Hanover, Germany. He was the son of an architect, John Bacon Hutchings (1859-1916), and in 1909, he began practicing as an architect with his father as John Bacon Hutchings & Sons. He served in France during World War I and was responsible for building the Sauvenay Hospital at Sauvenay, France. In 1919, he returned to his architectural practice in Louisville.

A number of their works are listed on the U.S. National Register of Historic Places.

Works include (with attribution):
Harriet Funk House, 9316 Hurstbourne, Jeffersontown, Kentucky (Hutchings, E.T.), NRHP-listed
Lyndon Cottage, Terminus of Hurstbourne Country Club Dr., Louisville, Kentucky (Hutchings, Eusebius Theodore), NRHP-listed
Madrid Building, 545 S. 3rd St., Louisville, Kentucky (Hutchings, E.T.), NRHP-listed
Midlands, 25 Poplar Hill Rd., Louisville, Kentucky (Hutchings E. T.), NRHP-listed
James Thompson House, 1400 Walmut Land, Anchorage, Kentucky (Hutchings, E.T.), NRHP-listed
George Woodard House, 232 W. Poplar St., Elizabethtown, Kentucky (Hutchings, E.T.), NRHP-listed
Numerous works in Glenview Historic District (Louisville, Kentucky), NRHP-listed
Rogers Clark Ballard Memorial School, 4200 Lime Kiln Ln., Louisville, Kentucky (Hutchings, John Bacon), NRHP-listed
One or more works in Cannelton Historic District, roughly bounded by Richardson, Taylor, First, and Madison Sts., Cannelton, Indiana (Hutchings, John Bacon), NRHP-listed

References

20th-century American architects
1886 births
1958 deaths
Architects from Louisville, Kentucky